In mathematics, the Hochschild–Mostow group, introduced by , is the universal pro-affine algebraic group generated by a group.

References

Algebraic groups